Amiantofusus amiantus is a species of sea snail, a marine gastropod mollusc in the family Fasciolariidae, the spindle snails, the tulip snails and their allies.

Description

Distribution

References

 Locard, A., 1897 – Mollusques testacés. In: Expéditions scientifiques du Travailleur et du Talisman pendant les années 1880, 1881, 1882, 1883, vol. 1, p. 516 p, 22

External links
 all W.H. 1889. Reports on the results of dredging, under the supervision of Alexander Agassiz, in the Gulf of Mexico (1877–78) and in the Caribbean Sea (1879–80), by the U.S. Coast Survey Steamer "Blake", Lieut.-Commander C.D. Sigsbee, U.S.N., and Commander J.R. Bartlett, U.S.N., commanding. XXIX. Report on the Mollusca. Part 2, Gastropoda and Scaphopoda. Bulletin of the Museum of Comparative Zoölogy at Harvard College, 18: 1–492, pls. 10–40
 Locard A. (1897–1898). Expéditions scientifiques du Travailleur et du Talisman pendant les années 1880, 1881, 1882 et 1883. Mollusques testacés. Paris, Masson. vol. 1 [1897], p. 1–516 pl. 1-22; vol. 2 [1898], p. 1–515, pl. 1-18
 Fraussen K., Kantor Y. & Hadorn R. 2007. Amiantofusus gen. nov. for Fusus amiantus Dall, 1889 (Mollusca: Gastropoda: Fasciolariidae) with description of a new and extensive Indo-West Pacific radiation. Novapex 8 (3–4): 79–101

Fasciolariidae
Gastropods described in 1889